Helena Zeťová (born 7 November 1980 in Valašské Meziříčí) is a Czech singer.

Career
She started singing at the age of 15, first with a rock band, and later with an American band on the Spanish island of Lanzarote (Canary Islands). Her career started changing after her win at the 2000 Do-Re-Mi amateur singer contest TV show, where she performed "Against All Odds" by Phil Collins. It was her first TV performance. In 2001, she, together with Tereza Kerndlová and Tereza Černochová, established a girl group . In 2002 they released their first studio album Modrej dým. The same year they earned the Czech Nightingale prize in the "Discovery of the Year" category.

In 2005 the band dissolved. Half a year later the same year Zeťová released her first solo album, Ready to Roll, and was named "Surprise of the Year" in the Czech Nightingale poll.

Discography

Black Milk

Studio albums
 Modrej dým (2002, platinum album)
 Sedmkrát (2003, gold album)
 Nechci tě trápit (2007, compilation)

Singles
 Nechci tě trápit (2002)
 Modrej dým (2002)
 Pár nápadů (2002)

Solo

Studio albums
2005: Ready to Roll (4th in Top 100 ))
2008: Crossing Bridges  (5th in Top 100 )

Singles
2005 - Impossible (Unstoppable) (1st in Top 100 )
2006 - Ready to Roll
2006 - Black Cat
2007 - Crossing Bridges (41st in Top 100 )
2008 - Love Me Again  (4th in Top 100 )
2008 - Don't U Play Games

References

External links

 
 
 

1980 births
Living people
21st-century Czech women singers
Czech pop singers
People from Valašské Meziříčí